Alfred Heinrich (21 February 1906 – 31 October 1975) was a German ice hockey player, born in Berlin, who competed in the 1932 Winter Olympics.

In 1932 he was a member of the German ice hockey team, which won the bronze medal. He played all six matches.

External links
profile

1906 births
1975 deaths
Ice hockey people from Berlin
Olympic ice hockey players of Germany
Ice hockey players at the 1932 Winter Olympics
Olympic bronze medalists for Germany
Olympic medalists in ice hockey
Medalists at the 1932 Winter Olympics